Åke Pettersson is a retired Swedish footballer. Pettersson made 15 Allsvenskan appearances for Djurgården and scored 3 goals.

References

Swedish footballers
Djurgårdens IF Fotboll players
Association footballers not categorized by position